Aay Khuku Aay is a 2022 Indian Bengali-language drama film directed by Sauvik Kundu. The film is produced by Jeet, Gopal Madnani and Amit Jumrani under the banner Jeetz Filmworks. The film stars Prosenjit Chatterjee and Ditipriya Roy in lead roles. The film is based on the relationship of a father and his daughter in rural Bengal.

Plot 
The film revolves around the relationship of a single father and his daughter in the suburbs of West Bengal.

Cast 
 Prosenjit Chatterjee as Nirmal Mondal
 Ditipriya Roy as Satabdi Mondal alias Buri
 Sohini Sengupta as Putul Rani Bagchi, local MLA
 Sankar Debnath as Gosai Kaka, Nirmal's friend
 Rafiath Rashid Mithila as Buri's mother
 Buddhadeb Bhattacharya as local police officer
 Rahul Dev Bose as Sanjay, Buri's friend
 Satyam Bhattacharya as Binoy, a book seller

Soundtrack 

The songs are composed by Ranojay Bhattacharjee and Savvy. The lyrics are penned by Saugata Dutta, Anindya Chatterjee and Ranojay Bhattacharjee.

Release 
The official teaser of the film was unveiled on 15 April 2022. The official trailer of the film was unveiled on 22 May 2022. The film was released theatrically on 17 June 2022.

Reception

References

External links 
 

Bengali-language Indian films
2020s Bengali-language films